Plate and Platé are surnames.

People bearing them include:

 Ludwig Hermann Plate (1862-1937), German zoologist
 Enrico Platé (1909–1954)
 Anton Plate (born 1950), German composer 
 Jeff Plate (born 1962)
 Christina Plate (born 1965), German actress
 Sebastian Plate (born 1979), German football player